Jerry David Claiborne (August 26, 1928 – September 24, 2000) was an American college football player and coach. Claiborne was inducted into the College Football Hall of Fame as a coach in 1999.

Early years
Claiborne attended the Hopkinsville High School and the University of Kentucky and was named the College of Education's Outstanding Senior. Claiborne played halfback under legendary coach Paul "Bear" Bryant at the University of Kentucky.

In 1950, he became the head football and basketball coach at Augusta Military Academy in Fort Defiance, Augusta County, Virginia. His teams won the Virginia State basketball championship in 1950 and the football championship in 1951. The following year, he left to become Bryant's assistant coach at Kentucky, following Bryant in the same capacity to Texas A&M and Alabama before he moved up to become a head coach.

Head coach

Virginia Tech
Claiborne's legacy was carried on by Frank Beamer, who played for Claiborne at Virginia Tech. Beamer built the program into a powerhouse in the mid-1990s. Claiborne's contributions to Tech's football program earned him a place in the Virginia Tech Sports Hall of Fame. 

For one season in 1971, Claiborne was the defensive coordinator (and assistant head coach) at the University of Colorado under Eddie Crowder. The third-ranked Buffaloes went 10–2, behind the teams they lost to (both on the road): undefeated national champion Nebraska and #2 Oklahoma, an unprecedented sweep of the top three slots by the Big Eight Conference.

Maryland
When Claiborne was hired at the University of Maryland in December 1971, the Terrapins had only won nine games in the previous five seasons. Claiborne led the Terps to a winning season after only his second year with the team. He posted a  record in his decade at Maryland, including an undefeated regular season in 1976, before losing to Houston in the Cotton Bowl. For six consecutive seasons beginning in 1973, the Terrapins appeared in bowl games, and added another in 1980. During this run, Maryland won three straight ACC titles (1974, 1975, 1976).

Kentucky
In December 1981, Claiborne followed in the footsteps of Bear Bryant and went from College Park to Lexington, Kentucky; the home of the University of Kentucky. In Claiborne's case, Kentucky was his alma mater. UK had incurred four straight losing seasons and offered Claiborne the position largely to help clean up a program racked by numerous recruiting violations during the tenure of previous head coach Fran Curci.

After starting with a winless record of 0–10–1 in 1982, Claiborne reached bowl games in his next two seasons, posting records of 6–5–1 in 1983 and 9–3 in 1984, after which the Wildcats were ranked nineteenth in the final AP poll. The Wildcats' win in the Hall of Fame Classic over Wisconsin was UK's last bowl win for 22 years, until the Music City Bowl victory over Clemson in 2006. Claiborne did not get to another bowl, getting no closer than 5–5–1 in 1986 and 6–5 in 1989, and then retired.

Europe
In 1992, Claiborne became the head coach of the Braunschweig Lions, and then German Division II Football team in Germany. During his one-year stay he laid the foundation for an organization, that became a European football powerhouse.

Significant achievements
 Claiborne coached four Academic All-Americans and eighty-seven all-conference academics.
 Named the nation's Coach of the Year by the Sporting News in 1974.
 Named Southeastern Conference Coach of the Year in 1983.
 Claiborne's Kentucky team won the College Football Association Academic Achievement Award for the highest graduation rate of 90% in 1989.
 The University of Kentucky named Claiborne into its Alumni Hall of Fame in 1992.
 In 1994, Claiborne received the Neyland Trophy, which is presented annually to a coach "who has contributed greatly to intercollegiate athletics" 
 In 1999 the Lexington, Kentucky's chapter of the National Football Foundation was named after Claiborne.
 Retired with a lifetime record of 179–122–8, ranking him fourth among active college coaches in victories when he retired.

Head coaching record

See also
List of presidents of the American Football Coaches Association

References

External links
 

1928 births
2000 deaths
American football halfbacks
Alabama Crimson Tide football coaches
Kentucky Wildcats football coaches
Kentucky Wildcats football players
Maryland Terrapins football coaches
Texas A&M Aggies football coaches
Virginia Tech Hokies football coaches
High school basketball coaches in Virginia
High school football coaches in Virginia
College Football Hall of Fame inductees
Sportspeople from Hopkinsville, Kentucky
Coaches of American football from Kentucky
Players of American football from Kentucky
American expatriate sportspeople in Germany